Laurophyllus is a monotypic genus of dioecious shrubs in the subfamily Anacardioideae of the cashew and sumac family Anacardiaceae. It contains the single species Laurophyllus capensis, which is endemic to the Eastern Cape province of South Africa. The species is found on wooded hillsides and by streams.

References

Anacardiaceae
Endemic flora of South Africa
Monotypic Sapindales genera
Anacardiaceae genera
Dioecious plants